Olănești is a village in Ștefan Vodă District, Moldova.

From May 26, 1941 to June 1959, the village was the administrative center of the abolished Olănești district.

Population 
By Population Census 2004 in Olănești live 5297 people (2511 men, 2786 women).

References

Villages of Ștefan Vodă District
Populated places on the Dniester